St Michaels railway station is a railway station in St Michael's Hamlet, Liverpool, England, on the Northern Line of the Merseyrail suburban system.  It is situated near, but not on St Michael's Road, Aigburth, a short distance to the south of the Lark Lane and Sefton Park neighbourhoods. The main station building sits at street level, over the lines which are in a cutting. Leading down to the platforms, from apertures in the station building, are ramps which were built for the International Garden Festival in 1984.

History
The station opened in 1864 as part of the Garston and Liverpool Railway line between Brunswick and Garston Dock. In 1865 the station and line were incorporated into the Cheshire Lines Committee.

The station closed in 1972 but reopened in 1978 as part of the Kirkby–Garston line of the Merseyrail system. The reopening of the station was part-funded by Marks and Spencer, because of that company's use of the "St Michael" brand; this is recognised by a plaque at the site. Services were extended from Garston to Hunts Cross in 1983, and diverted to Southport instead of Kirkby in 1984.

From 11 December 2006 the Monday-Saturday evening service was increased to run every 15 minutes, instead of half-hourly as previously.

Facilities
Ramps, which were installed for the International Garden Festival in 1984, allow access to the platforms. Steps to street level (bypassing the ticket office) have been sealed off. In November 2021, the ramps were removed and the steps to the platform, previously sealed off, were reinstated. The removal of the ramps will allow for lifts to be installed at a later date. 

The station is staffed 15 minutes before the first service and 15 minutes after the last service. There are toilets, platform CCTV and a booking office. There are departure and arrival screens on the platform for passenger information. The station has car parking for 4 vehicles, a cycle rack with 12 spaces and secure storage for 28 cycles.

Merseytravel announced in April 2019 that they had been successful in a bid for funding lifts being installed at the station under the Department for Transport's ‘Access for All’ programme. The lifts are expected to be installed at some point over the following five years.

Services
Trains operate every 20 minutes, Monday-Saturday to Southport via Liverpool Central to the north, and Hunts Cross to the south. On Sundays, services are every 30 minutes in each direction.

Gallery

References

External links

Railway stations in Liverpool
DfT Category E stations
Former Cheshire Lines Committee stations
Railway stations in Great Britain opened in 1864
Railway stations in Great Britain closed in 1972
Railway stations in Great Britain opened in 1978
Railway stations served by Merseyrail
1864 establishments in England